Sidi Abd As-Salam Al-Asmar (Al-Lasmar `Abd as-Salām) was a renowned religious Libyan Muslim saint who lived and died during the 15th century (1455–1575 CE). He is called  al-Asmar because he stayed up most of the night in prayer.

Life
He belonged to the Fawatir tribe, while the nickname al-Asmar was given to him by his mother, who is believed to have been ordered to do so in a dream. He received his early mystical training from Abd al-Wahid al-Dukali, a khalifa of the Shadhili 'Arusi order who initiated him into the tariqa.

Al-Asmar lived as a zahid (ascetic), alone in Libya's vast desert performing various types of miracles for those in need. Later in life he became a mujahid (holy warrior), taking up arms in defense of his city. He died in 1575 at the age of 120 and his tomb became a place of pilgrimage, a large masjid was constructed in his remembrance at the location surrounding his grave. Not far from the masjid is one of the most respected and renowned Quranic educational institutions (madrasah) in Libya, named Al-Jamiaa Al-Asmariya ( i.e. Al-Asmariya Islamic University). A small archaeological museum contains various frescoes from the villa of Dar Buc Ammera and a collection of ceramic Roman artifacts belonging to the various tombs found on the peripheries.

On the anniversary of the destruction of tombs of the Al-Baqi' graveyard, the mosque and grave of Al-Asmar was reportedly destroyed on August 24, 2012 by Salafis and Wahhabis on the pretext that Islam does not allow worshipping graves and the dead (Reuters).

See also
Islam in Libya
List of Libyans
Zliten

Notes

External links
Zliten “Cities of the Saints”
Autre Libye
Medusa Tours

Libyan Muslims
15th-century Muslim scholars of Islam
Libyan scholars
15th-century Libyan people
16th-century Libyan people
People from Zliten
1455 births
1575 deaths
16th-century Muslim scholars of Islam